Womina is a rural locality in the Southern Downs Region, Queensland, Australia.

History 
The locality was named and bounded on 5 September 2003. It takes its name from a former railway station name, which is Aboriginal word meaning  "one."

References 

Southern Downs Region
Localities in Queensland